Saint-Jean-Pla-de-Corts is a commune in the Pyrénées-Orientales department in southern France.

Geography 
Saint-Jean-Pla-de-Corts is located in the canton of Vallespir-Albères and in the arrondissement of Céret.

Population

See also
Communes of the Pyrénées-Orientales department

References

Communes of Pyrénées-Orientales